The Downtown Bismarck Historic District is a  historic district in Bismarck, North Dakota that was listed on the National Register of Historic Places in 2001.  It includes work by architect Arthur Van Horn and others.  The listing included 40 contributing buildings.

References

Victorian architecture in North Dakota
Historic districts on the National Register of Historic Places in North Dakota
National Register of Historic Places in Bismarck, North Dakota